The Puerto Rican Workers' Revolutionary Party (PRTP) is a far-left  political party in Puerto Rico.

The PRTP was formed in 1976, and in 1978 founded the Boricua Popular Army (EPB, more commonly known as the Macheteros) as a mass organization. The EPB broke off from the PRTP in 1984.

The PRTP is affiliated with the Socialist Front.

References

External links
 PRTP web site 

Political parties in Puerto Rico
Political parties established in 1976
Communist parties in Puerto Rico
1976 establishments in Puerto Rico